Queen Christina is a pre-Code Hollywood biographical film, produced for Metro-Goldwyn-Mayer in 1933 by Walter Wanger and directed by Rouben Mamoulian. It stars Swedish-born actress Greta Garbo and John Gilbert in their fourth and last film together.

The film portrays the life of Queen Christina of Sweden, who became monarch at the age of six in 1632 and grew to be a powerful and influential leader. As well as coping with the demands of ruling Sweden during the Thirty Years' War, Christina is expected to marry a suitable royal figure and produce an heir. When she falls in love with a visiting Spanish envoy, whom she is forbidden to marry because he is a Roman Catholic, she must choose between love and her royal duty.

The film was a major commercial and critical success in the United States and worldwide.

Plot
Queen Christina of Sweden (Greta Garbo) is devoted to her country and the welfare of her people. As queen, she favors peace for Sweden and argues convincingly for an end to the Thirty Years' War, saying:

Spoils, glory, flags and trumpets! What is behind these high-sounding words? Death and destruction, triumphals of crippled men, Sweden victorious in a ravaged Europe, an island in a dead sea. I tell you, I want no more of it. I want for my people security and happiness. I want to cultivate the arts of peace, the arts of life. I want peace and peace I will have!

Christina, who first took the throne at age six upon the death of her father in battle, is depicted as being so devoted to both governing well and educating herself that she has spurned any kind of serious romance or marriage, despite pressure from her councilors and court to marry her heroic cousin Karl Gustav (Reginald Owen) and produce an heir. One day, in an effort to escape the restrictions of her royal life, she sneaks out of town and ends up at the same inn as Antonio (John Gilbert), a Spanish envoy on his way to the capital. The two talk and become friends, though Antonio thinks Christine is a man because of the way she is dressed. When the innkeeper, who is also unaware of Christine's identity, asks if she will let Antonio share her bed because there is not a room available for him, Christine is unable to come up with a suitable reason to deny the request. In her room, she reveals to Antonio that she is a woman, but not that she is a queen, and they spend the night together. Their tryst is extended by a few days when they become snowbound at the inn.

When the time comes for Christina and Antonio to part, Christina assures Antonio that they will reunite in Stockholm. To his surprise, this occurs when the Spaniard is presented to the Queen, whom he recognizes as his lover. Antonio is initially somewhat hurt and annoyed because he thinks Christina has played a trick on him and compromised his loyalty to the King of Spain, who sent Antonio on this mission to Sweden to present Christina with an offer of marriage on his behalf. She makes it clear that her feelings for Antonio are genuine and that she regularly receives such offers from foreign royalty and has no intention of accepting the King's proposal, and she and Antonio patch things up.

When the scheming Count Magnus (Ian Keith), who had previously had some romantic liaisons with the Queen, rouses the people against the Spaniard, Christina is able to ease tensions for a time, but ultimately, she decides to name Karl Gustav as her successor and, in a move that shocks the entire court, abdicates the throne to be with Antonio. When she gets to the boat that is to take Antonio and her to Spain, she finds him gravely wounded from a sword duel with Magnus, which he lost. Antonio dies in her arms, but Christina resolves to proceed with the voyage. She envisions residing in the home Antonio described to her as sitting on white cliffs overlooking the sea.

Cast

 Greta Garbo as Christina, Queen of Sweden
 John Gilbert as Antonio Pimentel de Prado
 Ian Keith as Count Magnus Gabriel De la Gardie
 Lewis Stone as Axel Oxenstierna
 Elizabeth Young as Countess Ebba Sparre
 C. Aubrey Smith as Aage
 Reginald Owen as Charles X Gustav of Sweden
 Georges Renavent as Chanut, the French Ambassador
 David Torrence as Archbishop
 Gustav von Seyffertitz as General
 Ferdinand Munier as Innkeeper

Uncredited Cast
 Cora Sue Collins as Christina as a Child
 C. Montague Shaw as King Gustavus Adolphus of Sweden
 Akim Tamiroff as Pedro
 Barbara Barondess as Elsa
 Tiny Sandford as Cook at the Inn
 Bodil Rosing as Innkeeper's Wife
 Muriel Evans as Barmaid at the Inn
 Edward Gargan as Drinker Betting on 9
 Paul Hurst as Swedish Soldier Betting on 6
 Hooper Atchley as Antonio's Companion in Coach
 James Burke as Blacksmith Rabble Rouser
 Wade Boteler as Magnus' Rabble Rouser
 Gladden James as Rabble Rouser
 Richard Alexander as Peasant
 Edward Norris as Count Jacob
 Carrie Daumery as Woman at Court
 Fred Kohler as Member of Court

Production
The film was released in December 1933. It was directed by Rouben Mamoulian and written by H. M. Harwood and Salka Viertel, with dialogue by S. N. Behrman, based on a story by Viertel and Margaret P. Levino. The leading roles are played by Greta Garbo as Christina and John Gilbert as Don Antonio, an emissary from Spain. Laurence Olivier originally was cast as Antonio, but was fired during rehearsals. It was billed as Garbo's return to cinema after an eighteen-month hiatus. While on holiday in Sweden, the actress read a treatment by Viertel about the life of Christina and became interested in the story. At the time of shooting the film, Garbo was 28, the same age as her character.

Garbo herself insisted on having Gilbert as her co-star. It was the fourth and last time that they were in a film together, and it was Gilbert's penultimate film. He had been a huge star in the silent era, but the enmity of studio head Louis B. Mayer cast a pall over his career, and he died in January 1936 from heart attacks exacerbated by alcoholism.

The film is remembered for two iconic moments. The first is a scene in which, having spent two nights with Antonio in her room at the inn, Christina spends over three minutes walking around and examining and caressing various objects to imprint the space on her memory. The second, and arguably the most famous image in the film, is the closing shot, in which Christina stands as a silent figurehead at the bow of the ship bound for Spain, the wind blowing through her hair, while the camera moves into a tight close-up on her face. Prior to shooting the final scene, Mamoulian suggested that Garbo should think about nothing and avoid blinking her eyes so her face could be a "blank sheet of paper" and every member of the audience could write the ending of the film themselves.

Critical reception and box office
The film premiered in New York City on December 26, 1933, and opened in the rest of the world throughout 1934. It was nominated for the Mussolini Cup award at the Venice Film Festival in 1934, but lost to Man of Aran.

Queen Christina turned out to be a success with the critics, gathering many positive reviews. Critic Mordaunt Hall, writing for The New York Times, gave the film a positive review and liked the screenplay, calling the dialogue "a bright and smooth piece of writing" and referred to Mamoulian's direction as "entrancing". Positive opinions came also from Modern Screen'''s Walter Ramsey, who proclaimed it a "triumph for Garbo", and a reviewer for Photoplay, who acclaimed Garbo's "glorious reappearance".Motion Picture Daily called the film "creaky in spots", but reported that Garbo "does beautifully" and that the film was "well above the average in content and value." The New York Daily News wrote: "The picture moves a little slowly, but with grace, from one lovely setting to another. It is a picture that must not be missed, because Garbo is at her best in some of its scenes."

Some reviews were mixed. "Garbo overwhelms the picture", wrote John Mosher in The New Yorker. "The story, the setting, her support cannot live up to her." Variety found the film "slow and ofttimes stilted", though it wrote that Garbo's "regal impression is convincing, which counts for plenty." The Sun of New York wrote that "Garbo seems to be suffering from an acute case of glamour. And that is probably not her fault. Gilbert tried very hard, but his performance is a little stilted. Queen Christina misses fire, somehow, and that is disappointing."

According to the AFI Catalog, despite the critical acclaim, the film did not do well at the American box office. TCM's Frank Miller stated: "It would be years before foreign revenues and reissues brought the film into the profit column." In 1994, Barry Paris wrote that final tally was: "Cost: $1,144,000. Earnings: domestic $767,000; foreign $1,843,000; total $2,610,000. Profit: $632,000".

As of June 2020, Queen Christina had a 90% "Fresh" rating at Rotten Tomatoes, based on 21 reviews. Leonard Maltin gave the film 4 out of 4 stars, calling it "Probably Garbo's best film, with a haunting performance by the radiant star as 17th-century Swedish queen who relinquishes her throne for her lover, Gilbert. Garbo and Gilbert's love scenes together are truly memorable, as is the famous final shot...”

The part of Queen Christina is regarded as one of the better in Garbo's filmography, and the film is especially notable for resoundingly disproving rumors that John Gilbert's lack of success in the sound era was due to his having an unsuitable voice.

Historical accuracy
The film is a historical costume drama based loosely on the life of 17th-century Queen Christina of Sweden, and still more loosely on August Strindberg's history play Kristina. A number of historical characters appear in the film (such as Axel Oxenstierna, Charles X Gustav of Sweden, and Magnus Gabriel De la Gardie), and some historical events are depicted (such as the Thirty Years' War and Christina's abdication), but Queen Christina'' is not a film that adheres closely to the facts. In this highly fictionalized account, it is falling in love that brings Christina into conflict with the political realities of her society, whereas, in real life, Christina's main reasons for abdication were her determination not to marry, to live as she pleased, and to openly convert to Catholicism.

The romance with Antonio is fiction and can be seen as a typical "Hollywood" distortion of history—unless it is understood as an allegory, with her love for Don Antonio representing her love of the intellectual life and her embrace of the Catholic faith. In reality, Christina was devoted to her maid of honor, friend, and "bedfellow" Ebba Sparre. In the film, Christina kisses Ebba twice, but the kisses are quite chaste, and any suggestion of a romantic relationship between the two women is firmly blocked by a scene in which Christina comes upon Ebba and Count Jakob meeting on a staircase and immediately leaves for what will be her encounter with Antonio. When Christina returns, she apologizes to Ebba and promises she may marry her beloved Count. The real Ebba did marry Count Jakob, but the marriage was an unhappy one.

The film is correct in stating that Christina's father had her raised as if she were a boy, with the education and responsibilities expected of a male heir, and in depicting her habit of dressing as a man, which continued throughout her life. The historical Christina was, also, indeed adamant about making peace, and was a patron of science, art, and culture, dreaming of making Stockholm the "Athens of the North".

References

External links

 
 
 
 
 

1933 films
1930s historical drama films
1933 romantic drama films
1930s biographical drama films
American historical drama films
American biographical drama films
American romantic drama films
American LGBT-related films
Biographical films about Swedish royalty
Cultural depictions of Christina, Queen of Sweden
Cultural depictions of Gustavus Adolphus of Sweden
American black-and-white films
1930s English-language films
Films set in Sweden
Films set in the 1640s
Films set in the 1650s
Metro-Goldwyn-Mayer films
Films directed by Rouben Mamoulian
Films produced by Walter Wanger
Films scored by Herbert Stothart
American historical romance films
1930s LGBT-related films
LGBT-related romantic drama films
1930s historical romance films
1930s American films